Shushan is a hamlet in the town of Salem in Washington County, New York, United States. It is in the eastern region of the state, located four miles west of the Vermont border. Its ZIP code is 12873.

Among Shushan's attractions is the Shushan Bridge, constructed in 1858.

Notable people
The classical saxophonist Sigurd Raschèr owned a farm in Shushan, and died there in 2001.
Grey Villet, a photojournalist with Life magazine, lived in Shushan in the second half of the 20th century and died there in 2000.

References

External links
Town of Salem, New York: Shushan Covered Bridge Museum

Hamlets in New York (state)
Hamlets in Washington County, New York
Glens Falls metropolitan area